Kerbel is a surname. Notable people with the surname include:

 Janice Kerbel (born 1969), British artist
 Joe Kerbel (1921–1973), American football coach
 Lev Kerbel (1917–2003), Soviet sculptor

See also
 Kerber (surname)
 Kerpel